Leslie Tom Morris (October 10, 1904 – November 13, 1964) was a Welsh-Canadian politician, journalist and longtime member of the Communist Party of Canada and, its front group, the Labor-Progressive Party. He was leader of the Ontario Labor-Progressive Party in the 1940s and general secretary of the Communist Party of Canada from 1962 until his death in 1964.

Life and career
Morris was born in Somerset, England, to a Welsh working-class family. He and his family immigrated to Canada in 1910. Morris returned to the UK in 1917 and lived in Wales and England while working in the steel, coal mining and railway industries. He returned to Canada in time to join the Communist Party of Canada at its founding convention held December 1921 in Guelph, Ontario.

He became a prominent figure in the party first as secretary of the Young Communist League of Canada from 1923 to 1924, and then as editor over the years of various Communist newspapers including The Worker, Daily Clarion, Daily Tribune and Canadian Tribune.

Morris supported Tim Buck and the supporters of Joseph Stalin in the party during the factional struggles and purges of the late 1920s and early 1930s.

He was a candidate for the House of Commons of Canada on several occasions, but never elected:
 In the 1940 election, he ran as a Communist in Winnipeg North, coming in third place with 17% of the vote, which was larger than the number of votes separating the Conservative victor from the defeated Cooperative Commonwealth Federation incumbent, Abraham Albert Heaps.
In a 1954 by-election, Morris was the Labor-Progressive candidate in the Toronto-area riding of York West, and came in fourth (and last) place with only 282 votes.
In the 1958 election, he ran in York South, placing fourth out of five candidates with 427 votes.
In the 1962 election, he ran for the Communist Party in the Toronto riding of Trinity winning 449 votes.
He tried again in the 1963 election in the same riding, and won 391 votes

Morris also campaigned unsuccessfully for provincial office. In the Manitoba provincial election of 1932, he ran in the city of Winnipeg as a "United Front Workers" candidate (the Communist Party being under legal proscription at the time). At the time, the provincial constituency of Winnipeg elected ten members by the single transferable ballot system. Morris finished eighth on the first count, and came within 309 votes of winning the tenth seat on the final count. Had he won, he would have been the first Communist elected to a provincial legislature in Canada. Litterick would be elected in 1936 setting that record.)

Morris was a popular stump speaker for the party and toured the country speaking to left wing and labour audiences. From 1954 until 1957, he was the national organizer of the Labor-Progressive Party (as the Communist Party had been known since 1943) and, in 1962, he succeeded Tim Buck as General Secretary of the Communist Party of Canada (as it was again known) and held the position until his death two years later.

Electoral record

References

1904 births
1964 deaths
Leaders of the Communist Party of Canada
Canadian people of Welsh descent
Welsh communists
Leaders of the Communist Party of Canada (Ontario)
Communist Party of Canada candidates in the 1940 Canadian federal election
Labor-Progressive Party candidates in the 1958 Canadian federal election
Communist Party of Canada candidates in the 1962 Canadian federal election
Communist Party of Canada candidates in the 1963 Canadian federal election
British emigrants to Canada